Whistle Pops (or called Melody Pops in some countries) were a lollipop brand produced by Spangler Candy Company starting in the 1970s that were designed to make a whistling sound. They were produced with a hole in them, and when blown into, a whistling sound would emanate from the confectionery.

Reintroduction
After being discontinued for a few years, the company Chupa Chups reintroduced Whistle Pops, naming them Melody Pops, and markets them in the United States. Melody Pops are marketed with a tagline stating "play real music".

In the United Kingdom

In the United Kingdom (UK) some pharmacies stock Whistle Pops.

See also
 List of candies
 List of confectionery brands
 Ring Pop

References

Further reading
 
  – has an image of Whistle Pops packaging

External links
 Melody Pops official website

Brand name confectionery
Lollipops